Leucoma luteipes is a moth in the  family Erebidae.

Distribution
This species is found in Angola, Cameroon, Congo, Equatorial Guinea, Gabon, Nigeria and Sierra Leone.

References

Lymantriinae
Moths of Africa
Moths described in 1855